Coppa Italia Serie D (Italian for Serie D Italian Cup) is a straight knock-out based competition involving teams from Serie D in Italian football.  The competition is held since the 1999–2000, when Serie D clubs split from Coppa Italia Dilettanti, a tournament that was opened also to teams from Eccellenza and Promozione.

Past winners

1999–2000 – Castrense
2000–01 – Todi
2001–02 – Pievigina
2002–03 – Sansovino
2003–04 – Juve Stabia
2004–05 – U.S.O. Calcio
2005–06 – Sorrento
2006–07 – Aversa Normanna
2007–08 – Como
2008–09 – Sapri
2009–10 – Matera
2010–11 – Perugia
2011–12 – Sant'Antonio Abate
2012–13 – Torre Neapolis
2013–14 – Pomigliano
2014–15 – Monopoli
2015–16 – Fondi
2016–17 – Chieri
2017–18 – Campodarsego
2018–19 – Matelica
2019–20 – Not concluded due COVID-19 pandemic
2020–21 – Not played
2021–22 – Follonica Gavorrano

See also
 Football in Italy
 Serie D
 Coppa Italia Dilettanti

External links
 History of the competition at lnd.com 

 
6
Coppa
Recurring sporting events established in 1999
1999 establishments in Italy